Patrick Neal Minges (35), is an American author and historian specializing in the cultural interactions among Native Americans and Africans. With several books to his credit, he continues to write and teach.

Education 
Minges graduated from East Carolina University with a master's in Counseling. He then earned a M.Div and Ph.D. at the Union Theological Seminary.

Writing career
Minges is the author of several books, most of which deal with the various Native American tribes of North America, their long histories and their rich cultures.

Books

Slavery in the Cherokee Nation: The Keetoowah Society and the Defining of a People 1855-1867 (2003)
Black Indian Slave Narratives (2004)
Far More Terrible for Women: Personal Accounts of Women in Slavery (2006)

References

East Carolina University alumni
21st-century American historians
21st-century American male writers
Living people
Year of birth missing (living people)
American male non-fiction writers